is a railway station on the Hohi Main Line operated by JR Kyushu in Aso, Kumamoto, Japan.

Lines

Layout 
The station consists of an island platform serving two tracks at grade. The station building is a wooden structure of traditional Japanese design with a double tiled roof and has been built and decorated to resemble a Shinto shrine. It houses a waiting room and a staffed ticket window. Access to the island platform is by means of a level  crossing. South of the station are numerous passing loops, sidings and a turntable, all belonging to a depot on the Hōhi Main Line.

Management of the station has been outsourced to the JR Kyushu Tetsudou Eigyou Co., a wholly owned subsidiary of JR Kyushu specialising in station services. It staffs the ticket window which is equipped with a POS machine but does not have a Midori no Madoguchi facility.

Adjacent stations

History
The line was extended eastward in phases and Miyaji was established as the eastern terminal on 25 January 1918. Through-traffic was established between Kumamoto and Ōita. The two lines were merged and the entire stretch redesignated as the Hōhi Main Line. With the privatization of Japanese National Railways (JNR), the successor of JGR, on 1 April 1987, Miyaji station came under the control of JR Kyushu.

On 17 September 2017, Typhoon Talim (Typhoon 18) damaged the Hōhi Main Line at several locations. Services between Aso and Nakahanda, including Miyaji, were suspended and replaced by bus services. Rail service from Aso through Miyaji to Miemachi was restored by 22 September 2017 Normal rail services between Aso and Ōita were restored by 2 October 2017.

Environs
Aso City Hall
National Route 57
Aso Shrine
Sensuikyō Gorge

See also
List of railway stations in Japan

References

External links
Miyaji (JR Kyushu)

Railway stations in Kumamoto Prefecture
Railway stations in Japan opened in 1918